{{Infobox station | symbol_location = saopaulo | symbol = metro| name = Tatuapé
| type          = 
| style         = São Paulo Metro
| image         = Tatuape Metro.jpg
| image_caption = Entrance to Tatuapé Station
| address       = R. Catiguá
| borough       = Tatuapé
| country       = Brazil
| coordinates   = 
| line          = 
| connections   =  Tatuapé Bus Terminal
| structure     = At-grade
| platform      = Side and island platforms
| opened        = 5 November 1981
| ADA           = y
| code          = TAT
| owned         =  Government of the State of São Paulo
| operator      =   Companhia do Metropolitano de São Paulo   CPTM
| passengers    =  71,000/business day
| services      = 
| other_services_header =Out-of-system interchange
| other_services = 
| map_name = Track layout
| route_map = {{Routemap|inline=1
|map-title = Line  track layout
|map =
uSTR!~MFADEg\uSTR!~MFADEg~~ ~~ ~~to Belém
uSTRf\uSTRg
uSTR+BSlr\uSTR+BSlr
uSTR+BSlr\uSTR+BSlr
uSTR+BSlr\uSTR+BSlr
uSTR+BSlr\uSTR+BSlr
uSTRf\uSTRg
uSTR!~MFADEf\uSTR!~MFADEf~~ ~~ ~~to Carrão–Assaí Atacadista|map2-title =  track layout
|map2 = 
STR!~MFADEg\STR!~MFADEg\\~~ ~~ ~~ to BrásSTRg\STRf\STR!~MFADEg\STR!~MFADEg~~ ~~ ~~ to BrásSTR\STR\STRg\STRf
STR!~BSl\STR!~BSr\STR!~BSl\STR!~BSr
STR!~BSl\STR!~BSr\STR!~BSl\STR!~BSr
STR!~BSl\STR!~BSr\STR!~BSl\STR!~BSr
STR!~BSl\STR!~BSr\STR!~BSl\STR!~BSr
STR\STR\STRg\STRf
STRg\STRf\STR!~MFADEf\STR!~MFADEf~~ ~~ ~~ to Engenheiro GoulartSTR!~MFADEf\STR!~MFADEf\\~~ ~~ ~~ to Corinthians-Itaquera}}}}
Tatuapé is a station which is part of a metropolitan system composed by CPTM and São Paulo Metro.

It is connected to Shopping Metrô Tatuape (south to the station) and Shopping Metrô Boulevard Tatuapé (north to the station). It's located in the homonymous district of Tatuapé, divided physically between areas 3 and 4 of the capital.

History
 
The project of Tatuapé station began in 1973, when the Federal Railway Network (RFFSA) and the São Paulo Metro agreed for the construction of an east track of the Line East-West (current Line 3-Red). The first project was published in May 1975 and predicted the connection of the Metro lines and RFFSA suburbs in Tatuapé station. The construction of Line East-West began in March 1976, but the first Executive Order of expropriation for the construction of the future Tatuapé station was published only on June.

Besides the signature of a memorandum of understanding between RFFSA and the Metro in June 1977, the station construction were initiated by constructure company Beter S.A. only on 29 April 1978. On 29 April 1979, a new phase of construction was launched, when a new track of Radial Leste was delivered, allowing the start of the construction of the main block of Tatuapé station, with a  total area. Promised for mid-1980, the station had its opening delayed because of problems with funds.

Tatuapé station was opened by Governor Paulo Maluf, using a wheelchair (besides the station didn't have any elevator - the first was installed only in 1982), on 5 November 1981.

Characteristics

Tatuapé is a station with distribution mezzanine above island and side platforms on surface, structure in apparent concrete and lattice special metallic cover. It has access for people with disabilities and reduced movements, a  area, and capacity for 60,000 passengers per hour in peak hours.

Toponymy
The word "Tatuapé" is an indigenous term of tupi origin that can mean "way of the armadillos" (tatu: armadillo, and apé'': way).

Connections
Tatuapé station of the São Paulo Metro Line 3-Red has paid connection with stations of CPTM Lines 11-Coral and 12-Sapphire, except in special hours, from Mondays to Fridays between 10am and 5pm and between 8pm and 12am, on Saturdays between 3pm and 1am, and on Sundays and holidays the connection is free during all the operational day.

There is also the possibility to connect with the bus system through the North and South Bus Terminals, both connected to the station, using the Bilhete Único. From the North Terminal there are departure of urban buses of the Airport Bus Service with direct route to São Paulo–Guarulhos International Airport. Another possibility is using the Line 13-Jade Airport-Connect service.

References

São Paulo Metro stations
Companhia Paulista de Trens Metropolitanos stations
Railway stations opened in 1981
1981 establishments in Brazil